Wilhelm Neef (28 January 1916 – 20 March 1990) was a German conductor and composer. He produced a number of film scores for the East German film industry.

Selected filmography
 Ernst Thälmann - Sohn seiner Klasse (1954)
 Ernst Thälmann - Führer seiner Klasse (1955)
 The Mayor of Zalamea (1956)
 The Captain from Cologne (1956)
 Castles and Cottages (1957)
 Intrigue and Love (1959)
 Minna von Barnhelm (1962)
 Christine (1963)
 The Sons of Great Bear (1966)
 Husaren in Berlin (1971)

Bibliography
 Spencer, Kristopher. Film And Television Scores, 1950-1979: A Critical Survey by Genre. McFarland, 2008.

External links

1916 births
1990 deaths
German male conductors (music)
Musicians from Cologne
20th-century German conductors (music)
20th-century German male musicians
20th-century German composers